is an Australian rugby union player who plays as a Centre.

References

1997 births
Living people
Rugby union fly-halves
Rugby union centres
Rugby union fullbacks
Sunwolves players
Canberra Vikings players
Brisbane City (rugby union) players
San Diego Legion players